Great Bridge may refer to:

England:
 Great Barford Bridge, spanning the River Great Ouse at Great Barford, Bedfordshire
 Great Bridge, West Midlands, an area of Sandwell, West Midlands
 Great Bridge, the former name of Magdalene Bridge, Cambridge

United States:
 Great Bridge (Cambridge), a bridge across the Charles River in Cambridge, Massachusetts
 Great Bridge, Virginia, a community in Chesapeake, Virginia
 Battle of Great Bridge, Revolutionary War battle in Virginia
 Great Bridge Bridge, drawbridge over the Atlantic Intracoastal Waterway
 Great River Bridge, an asymmetrical, one-tower cable-stayed bridge over the Mississippi River between Iowa and Illinois
 Great Stone Bridge, or Stone Arch Bridge (Minneapolis)

Elsewhere:
 Great Belt Bridge, part of the Great Belt Fixed Link, connecting the Danish islands of Zealand and Funen
 Great Seto Bridge, a series of double deck bridges connecting Okayama and Kagawa prefectures in Japan across a series of five small islands in the Seto Inland Sea

Miscellaneous:
 The Great Bridge (book), by David McCullough